Cockney is an accent and dialect of English, mainly spoken in London and its environs, particularly by working-class and lower middle-class Londoners. The term "Cockney" has traditionally been used to describe a person from the East End, or born within earshot of Bow Bells, although it most commonly refers to the broad variety of English native to London.

Estuary English is an intermediate accent between Cockney and Received Pronunciation, also widely spoken in and around London, as well as in wider southeastern England. In multicultural areas of London, the Cockney dialect is, to an extent, being replaced by Multicultural London English—a new form of speech with significant Cockney influence.

Words and phrases

Etymology of Cockney
The earliest recorded use of the term is 1362 in passus VI of William Langland's Piers Plowman, where it is used to mean "a small, misshapen egg", from Middle English coken + ey ("a cock's egg"). Concurrently, the mythical land of luxury Cockaigne (attested from 1305) appeared under a variety of spellings, including Cockayne, Cocknay, and Cockney, and became humorously associated with the English capital London.

The current meaning of Cockney comes from its use among rural Englishmen (attested in 1520) as a pejorative term for effeminate town-dwellers, from an earlier general sense (encountered in "The Reeve's Tale" of Geoffrey Chaucer's The Canterbury Tales ) of a "cokenay" as "a child tenderly brought up" and, by extension, "an effeminate fellow" or "a ". This may have developed from the sources above or separately, alongside such terms as "" and "" which both have the sense of "to make a  ... or darling of", "to indulge or pamper". By 1600, this meaning of cockney was being particularly associated with the Bow Bells area. In 1617, the travel writer Fynes Moryson stated in his Itinerary that "Londoners, and all within the sound of Bow Bells, are in reproach called Cockneys." The same year, John Minsheu included the term in this newly restricted sense in his dictionary Ductor in Linguas.

Other terms
 Cockney sparrow: Refers to the archetype of a cheerful, talkative Cockney.
 Cockney diaspora: The term Cockney diaspora refers to the migration of Cockney speakers to places outside London, especially new towns. It also refers to the descendants of those people, in areas where there was enough migration for an identification with London to persist in subsequent generations.
 Mockney: Refers to a fake Cockney accent, though the term is sometimes also used as a self-deprecatory moniker, by second, third and subsequent generations of the Cockney diaspora.

Region
Originally, when London consisted of little more than the walled City, the term applied to all Londoners, and this lingered into the 19th century. As the city grew the definitions shifted to alternatives based on more specific geography, or of dialect. 
The terms "East End of London" and "within the sound of Bow bells" are sometimes used interchangeably, and the bells are a symbol of East End identity. The area within earshot of the bells changes with the wind, but there is a correlation between the two geographic definitions under the typical prevailing wind conditions.

London's East End
The traditional core districts of the East End include Bethnal Green, Whitechapel, Spitalfields, Stepney, Wapping, Limehouse, Poplar, Haggerston, Aldgate, Shoreditch, the Isle of Dogs, Hackney, Hoxton, Bow and Mile End. The informal definition of the East End gradually expanded to include towns in south-west Essex such as Barking, East Ham, Leyton, Plaistow, Stratford, Wanstead, Walthamstow and West Ham as these formed part of London's growing conurbation.

Bow Bells' audible range

The church of St Mary-le-Bow is one of the oldest, largest and historically most important of the many churches in the City of London. The definition based on being born within earshot of the bells, cast at the Whitechapel Bell Foundry, reflects the early definition of the term as relating to all of London.

The audible range of the Bells is dependent on geography and wind conditions. The east is mostly low lying, a factor which combines with the strength and regularity of the prevailing wind, blowing from west-south-west for nearly three-quarters of the year, to carry the sound further to the east, and more often. A 2012 study showed that in the 19th century, and under typical conditions, the sound of the bells would carry as far as Clapton, Bow and Stratford in the east but only as far as Southwark to the south and Holborn in the west. An earlier study suggested the sound would have carried even further.
The 2012 study showed that in the modern era, noise pollution means that the bells can only be heard as far as Shoreditch. According to legend, Dick Whittington heard the bells 4.5 miles away at the Highgate Archway, in what is now north London. The studies mean that it is credible that Whittington might have heard them on one of the infrequent days that the wind blows from the south.

The church of St. Mary-le-Bow was destroyed in 1666 by the Great Fire of London and rebuilt by Sir Christopher Wren. Although the bells were destroyed again in 1941 in the Blitz, they had fallen silent on 13 June 1940 as part of the British anti-invasion preparations of World War II. Before they were replaced in 1961, there was a period when, by the "within earshot" definition, no "Bow Bell" Cockneys could be born. The use of such a literal definition produces other problems, since the area around the church is no longer residential and the noise pollution means few are born within earshot.

Dialect 

Cockney speakers have a distinctive accent and dialect, and occasionally use rhyming slang. The Survey of English Dialects took a recording from a long-time resident of Hackney in the 1950s, and the BBC made another recording in 1999 which showed how the accent had changed. One of the characteristic pronunciations of Cockney is th-fronting.

The early development of Cockney vocabulary is obscure, but appears to have been heavily influenced by Essex and related eastern dialects, while borrowings from Yiddish, including kosher (originally Hebrew, via Yiddish, meaning legitimate) and stumm ( originally German, via Yiddish, meaning mute), as well as Romani, for example wonga (meaning money, from the Romani "wanga" meaning coal), and cushty (Kushty) (from the Romani kushtipen, meaning good) reflect the influence of those groups on the development of the speech.

John Camden Hotten, in his Slang Dictionary of 1859, makes reference to "their use of a peculiar slang language" when describing the costermongers of London's East End.

Migration and evolution
A dialectological study of Leytonstone in 1964 found that the area's dialect was very similar to that recorded in Bethnal Green by Eva Sivertsen but there were still some features that distinguished Leytonstone speech from Cockney.

Linguistic research conducted in the early 2010s suggests that today, certain elements of the Cockney accent are declining in usage within multicultural areas, where some traditional features of Cockney have been displaced by Multicultural London English, a multiethnolect particularly common amongst young people from diverse backgrounds. Nevertheless, the glottal stop, double negatives, and the vocalisation of the dark L (and other features of Cockney speech) are among the Cockney influences on Multicultural London English, and some rhyming slang terms are still in common usage.

An influential July 2010 report by Paul Kerswill, professor of sociolinguistics at Lancaster University, Multicultural London English: the emergence, acquisition and diffusion of a new variety, predicted that the Cockney accent will disappear from London's streets within 30 years. The study, funded by the Economic and Social Research Council, said that the accent, which has been around for more than 500 years, is being replaced in London by a new hybrid language. "Cockney in the East End is now transforming itself into Multicultural London English, a new, melting-pot mixture of all those people living here who learnt English as a second language", Kerswill said.

A series of new and expanded towns have often had a strong influence on local speech. Many areas beyond the capital have become Cockney-speaking to a greater or lesser degree, including the new towns of Hemel Hempstead, Basildon and Harlow, and expanded towns such as Grays, Chelmsford and Southend. However, this is, except where least mixed, difficult to discern because of common features: linguistic historian and researcher of early dialects Alexander John Ellis in 1890 stated that Cockney developed owing to the influence of Essex dialect on London speech.

Writing in 1981, the dialectologist Peter Wright identified the building of the Becontree estate in Dagenham as influential in the spread of Cockney dialect. This very large estate was built by the Corporation of London to house poor East Enders in a previously rural area of Essex. The residents typically kept their Cockney dialect rather than adopt an Essex dialect. Wright also reports that cockney dialect spread along the main railway routes to towns in the surrounding counties as early as 1923, spreading further after World War II when many refugees left London owing to the bombing, and continuing to speak Cockney in their new homes.

A more distant example where the accent stands out is Thetford in Norfolk, which tripled in size from 1957 in a deliberate attempt to attract Londoners by providing social housing funded by the London County Council.

Typical features

As with many accents of the United Kingdom, Cockney is non-rhotic. A final -er is pronounced  or lowered  in broad Cockney. As with all or nearly all non-rhotic accents, the paired lexical sets COMMA and LETTER, PALM/BATH and START, THOUGHT and NORTH/FORCE, are merged. Thus, the last syllable of words such as cheetah can be pronounced  as well in broad Cockney.
Broad  is used in words such as bath, path, demand. This originated in London in the 16th–17th centuries and is also part of Received Pronunciation (RP).
For example, Richard Whiteing spelt "Hyde Park" as Hy' Par'''. Like and light can be homophones. "Clapham" can be said as Cla'am (i. e.).  may also be flapped intervocalically, e.g. utter . London  are often aspirated in intervocalic and final environments, e.g., upper , utter , rocker , up , out , rock , where RP is traditionally described as having the unaspirated variants. Also, in broad cockney at least, the degree of aspiration is typically greater than in RP, and may often also involve some degree of affrication . Affricatives may be encountered in initial, intervocalic, and final position.
This feature results in Cockney being often mentioned in textbooks about Semitic languages while explaining how to pronounce the glottal stop.
Th-fronting:
  can become  in any environment.  "thin",  "maths".
  can become  in any environment except word-initially when it can be .  "they",  "bother".Yod-coalescence in words such as tune  or reduce  (compare traditional RP ).
The alveolar stops ,  are often omitted in informal Cockney, in non-prevocalic environments, including some that cannot be omitted in Received Pronunciation. Examples include  Dad's gonna and  turn left.
H-dropping. Sivertsen considers that  is to some extent a stylistic marker of emphasis in Cockney.
Diphthong alterations:
  → :  "beet"
  → :  "bait"
  →  or even  in "vigorous, dialectal" Cockney. This means that pairs such as laugh-life, Barton-biting may become homophones: , . But this neutralisation is an optional, recoverable one:  "bite"
  → :  "choice"
  →  or a monophthongal , perhaps with little lip rounding,  or :  "boot"
  → this diphthong typically starts in the area of the London , . The broadest Cockney variant approaches . There's also a variant that is used only by women, namely . "coat"
  and  have somewhat tenser onsets than in RP: , 
Among these, the triphthongal realization of  occurs most commonly.
Other vowel differences include
  may be a somewhat less open :  "cot"
  has a fully back variant, qualitatively equivalent to cardinal 5, which Beaken (1971) claims characterises "vigorous, informal" Cockney.
  →  or a quality like that of cardinal 4, :  "jumped up"
  →  or a closing diphthong of the type  when in non-final position, with the latter variants being more common in broad Cockney:  "sauce"-"source",  "laud"-"lord",  "water"
  →  or a centring diphthong/triphthong of the type  when in final position, with the latter variants being more common in broad Cockney; thus  "saw"-"sore"-"soar",  "law"-"lore",  "war"-"wore".
These variants are retained when the addition of a suffix turns the dark l clear. Thus a phonemic split has occurred in London English, exemplified by the minimal pair wholly  vs. holy . The development of L-vocalisation (see next section) leads to further pairs such as sole-soul  vs. so-sew , bowl  vs. Bow , shoulder  vs. odour , while associated vowel neutralisations may make doll a homophone of dole, compare dough . All this reinforces the phonemic nature of the opposition and increases its functional load. It is now well-established in all kinds of London-flavoured accents, from broad Cockney to near-RP.
  in some words (particularly good) is central . In other cases, it is near-close near-back , as in traditional RP.
Vocalisation of dark L, hence  for Millwall. It is also transcribed as a semivowel  by some linguists, e.g., Coggle and Rosewarne. Relatedly, there are many possible vowel neutralisations and absorptions in the context of a following dark L or its vocalised version; these include:
In broad Cockney, and to some extent in general popular London speech, a vocalised  is entirely absorbed by a preceding : e.g., salt and sort become homophones (although the contemporary pronunciation of salt  would prevent this from happening), and likewise fault-fought-fort, pause-Paul's, Morden-Malden, water-Walter. Sometimes such pairs are kept apart, in more deliberate speech at least, by a kind of length difference:  Morden vs.  Malden.
A preceding  is also fully absorbed into vocalised . The reflexes of earlier  and earlier  are thus phonetically similar or identical; speakers are usually ready to treat them as the same phoneme. Thus awful can best be regarded as containing two occurrences of the same vowel, . The difference between musical and music-hall, in an H-dropping broad Cockney, is thus nothing more than a matter of stress and perhaps syllable boundaries.
Before clear (i.e., prevocalic)  the neutralisations do not usually apply, thus  silly but  ceiling-sealing,  fully but  fooling.
In some broader types of Cockney, the neutralisation of  before non-prevocalic  may also involve , so that fall becomes homophonous with full and fool .
According to Siversten,  and  can also join in this neutralisation. But these developments are evidently restricted to broad Cockney, not being found in London speech in general.
Wells' impression is that the doll-dole neutralisation is rather widespread in London, but that involving dull less so.
For example,  (or fwee) instead of three,  instead of frosty. Peter Wright, a Survey of English Dialects fieldworker, concluded that this was not a universal feature of Cockneys but that it was more common to hear this in the London area than anywhere else in Britain.
An unstressed final -ow may be pronounced . This is common to most traditional, Southern English dialects except for those in the West Country.
Grammatical features:
Use of me instead of my, for example, "At's me book you got 'ere". (where 'ere' means 'there'). It cannot be used when "my" is emphasised; e.g., "At's my book you got 'ere."
Use of ain'tUse of double negatives, for example "I didn't see nuffink".
By the 1980s and 1990s, most of the features mentioned above had partly spread into more general south-eastern speech, giving the accent called Estuary English; an Estuary speaker will use some but not all of the Cockney sounds.

Perception
The Cockney accent has long been regarded as an indicator of low status. For example, in 1909 the Conference on the Teaching of English in London Elementary Schools issued by the London County Council, stating that "the Cockney mode of speech, with its unpleasant twang, is a modern corruption without legitimate credentials, and is unworthy of being the speech of any person in the capital city of the Empire". Others defended the language variety: "The London dialect is really, especially on the South side of the Thames, a perfectly legitimate and responsible child of the old kentish tongue [...] the dialect of London North of the Thames has been shown to be one of the many varieties of the Midland or Mercian dialect, flavoured by the East Anglian variety of the same speech". Since then, the Cockney accent has been more accepted as an alternative form of the English language rather than a lesser one, though the low status mark remains. In the 1950s, the only accent to be heard on the BBC (except in entertainment programmes such as The Sooty Show) was the RP of Standard English, whereas nowadays many different accents, including Cockney or accents heavily influenced by it, can be heard on the BBC. In a survey of 2,000 people conducted by Coolbrands in the autumn of 2008, Cockney was voted equal fourth coolest accent in Britain with 7% of the votes, while The Queen's English was considered the coolest, with 20% of the votes. Brummie was voted least popular, receiving just 2%. The Cockney accent often featured in films produced by Ealing Studios and was frequently portrayed as the typical British accent of the lower classes in movies by Walt Disney, though this was only so in London.

Spread
Studies have indicated that the heavy use of South East England accents on television and radio may be the cause of the spread of Cockney English since the 1960s.  Cockney is more and more influential and some claim that in the future many features of the accent may become standard.

Scotland
Studies have indicated that working-class adolescents in areas such as Glasgow have begun to use certain aspects of Cockney and other Anglicisms in their speech. infiltrating the traditional Glasgow patter. For example, TH-fronting is commonly found, and typical Scottish features such as the postvocalic  are reduced. Research suggests the use of English speech characteristics is likely to be a result of the influence of London and South East England accents featuring heavily on television, such as the popular BBC One soap opera EastEnders. However, such claims have been criticised.

England
Certain features of cockney – Th-fronting, L-vocalisation, T-glottalisation, and the fronting of the GOAT and GOOSE vowels – have spread across the south-east of England and, to a lesser extent, to other areas of Britain. However, Clive Upton has noted that these features have occurred independently in some other dialects, such as TH-fronting in Yorkshire and L-vocalisation in parts of Scotland.

The term Estuary English has been used to describe London pronunciations that are slightly closer to RP than Cockney. The variety first came to public prominence in an article by David Rosewarne in the Times Educational Supplement in October 1984. Rosewarne argued that it may eventually replace Received Pronunciation in the south-east. The phonetician John C. Wells collected media references to Estuary English on a website. Writing in April 2013, Wells argued that research by Joanna Przedlacka "demolished the claim that EE was a single entity sweeping the southeast. Rather, we have various sound changes emanating from working-class London speech, each spreading independently".

Pearly tradition
The Pearly Kings and Queens are famous as an East End institution, but that perception is not wholly correct as they are found in other places across London, including Peckham and Penge in south London.

Notable Cockneys

Adele, musician, from Tottenham
Danny Baker, broadcaster, born in Deptford
Michael Barrymore, actor, comedian and television presenter, born in Bermondsey
Alfie Bass, actor, from Bethnal Green
David Beckham, footballer, born in Leytonstone, raised in Chingford
Rob Beckett, comedian, from Lewisham
Roger Bisby, DIY expert, television presenter and journalist, born in the City of London
Jay Blades, furniture restorer and television presenter, from Hackney
Jamie Borthwick, actor, born in Barking
Billy Bragg, musician, from Barking
Eric Bristow, darts champion, born in Hackney, nicknamed the "Crafty Cockney"
James Buckley, actor and comedian, born in Croydon, raised in Dagenham
Jimmy Bullard, footballer and television personality, born in East Ham
Garry Bushell, journalist and rock musician, from Woolwich
Michael Caine, actor, born in Rotherhithe
Cartrain, artist, born in Leytonstone
Harry Champion, music-hall singer and comedian, born in Bethnal Green
Charlie Chaplin, comic actor, filmmaker, and composer, 16 April 1889, born in Walworth
Lorraine Chase, actress and model, from Deptford
Albert Chevalier, famous Victorian music hall singer, born in Royal Crescent
Amy Childs, television personality, born in Barking
Rylan Clark-Neal, television personality, presenter and singer, born in Stepney
Cockney Rejects, credited with creating a sub-genre of punk rock called Oi!, which gained its name from the use of Cockney dialect in its songs
Joe Cole, footballer, born in Paddington, raised in Somers Town
Gemma Collins, media personality and businesswoman, born in Romford
Roisin Conaty, comedian and actress, from Camden
Brian Conley, comedian, television presenter and actor, born in Paddington
Henry Cooper, boxer, born in Lambeth
Tony Cottee, footballer and commentator, born in Forest Gate, raised in East Ham
Dave Courtney, author and former gangster, born in Bermondsey
Phil Daniels, actor, from Islington
Dapper Laughs, comedian, from Kingston upon Thames
Jack Dash, political activist, born in Southwark
Jim Davidson, comedian and television presenter, from Kidbrooke
Peter Dean, actor, born in Hoxton
Devlin, rapper, born in Bermondsey, raised in Dagenham
Ian Dury, punk musician, born in Harrow, raised in Cranham
Dani Dyer, actress and television personality, from Newham
Danny Dyer, actor, from Custom House
Joey Essex, television personality, born in Southwark
Craig Fairbrass, actor, born in Mile End
Perry Fenwick, actor, from Canning Town
Micky Flanagan, comedian, born in Whitechapel, raised in Bethnal Green
Alan Ford, actor, born in Walworth
Jamie Foreman, actor, born in Bermondsey
Dean Gaffney, actor, born in Hammersmith
Bill Gardner, former football hooligan, born in Hornchurch
Bobby George, darts player and television presenter, born in Manor Park
Len Goodman, ballroom dancer and television personality, from Bethnal Green
Leslie Grantham, actor, born in Camberwell
Jimmy Greaves, footballer, born in Manor Park, raised in Hainault
Steve Harley, musician, frontman of the band Cockney Rebel, born in Deptford
Simon Harris (musician), DJ and record producer, born in Westminster
Steve Harris, musician, founder of Iron Maiden, from Leytonstone
Brian Harvey, musician, from Walthamstow
Barry Hearn, sporting events promoter, born in Dagenham
Eddie Hearn, sporting events promoter, born in Dagenham
Gordon Hill, also known as the Wealdstone Raider, internet meme, from Wealdstone
Chas Hodges, musician, member of the "Rockney" duo Chas & Dave, from Edmonton
Roy Hodgson, football manager and former player, born in Croydon
Bob Hoskins, actor, raised in Finsbury ParkConfirmed on Desert Island Discs, 18th November 1988 
Derek Jameson, journalist and broadcaster from Hackney
Steve Jones, rock guitarist with the Sex Pistols, singer, actor and radio DJ, from Shepherd's Bush
Harry Kane, footballer, born in Walthamstow, raised in Chingford
Gary Kemp, musician and actor, born in Smithfield
Martin Kemp, musician and actor, born in Islington
Ronnie Knight, former nightclub owner and gangster, born in Hoxton
Ronnie and Reggie Kray, criminals, born in Hoxton and lived in Bethnal Green
Frank Lampard, football manager and former player, born in Romford
Frank Lampard, Sr, former footballer, born in East Ham
Ken Livingstone, former Mayor of London and leader of the Greater London Council, born in Streatham
John Lydon, also known as Johnny Rotten, punk rock singer with the Sex Pistols, born in Holloway
Kellie Maloney, boxing promoter, born in Peckham
Glen Matlock, rock and punk rock musician, from Paddington
Derek Martin, actor, born in Bow
Hoxton Tom McCourt, punk rock/Oi! musician, from Hoxton/Shoreditch
Lenny McLean, bare knuckle/unlicensed boxer, actor, born in Hoxton
Paul Merson, footballer, manager and Sky Sports pundit, from Harlesden
Warren Mitchell, actor, known for playing Alf Garnett in Till Death Us Do Part, from Stoke NewingtonCharlie Mullins, businessman, founder of Pimlico Plumbers, born in St Pancras, raised in Elephant and Castle
Billy Murray, actor, born in Forest Gate, raised in Upton Park
Terry Naylor, former footballer, born in Islington
Mark Noble, footballer, born in Canning Town, raised in Beckton
Chubby Oates, club comedian and actor, from Bermondsey
Des O'Connor, television personality and singer, born in Stepney
Cliff Parisi, actor and former stand-up comedian, born in Poplar
Joe Pasquale, comedian, actor and television presenter, born in Grays
Dave Peacock, musician, member of the "Rockney" duo Chas & Dave, from Enfield
Jack Petchey, businessman and philanthropist, born in Plaistow
Martin Peters, former footballer and manager, born in Plaistow, raised in Dagenham
Claude Rains, the actor born in Camberwell in 1889 became famous after abandoning his heavy Cockney accent and developing a unique Mid-Atlantic accent described as "half American, half English and a little Cockney thrown in"
Harry Redknapp, former footballer and manager, born in Poplar
Mike Reid, actor and comedian, from Hackney
Shane Richie, actor and television presenter, born in Kensington
Jonathan Ross, television and radio presenter, born in St Pancras, raised in Leytonstone
Paul Ross, television and radio presenter, born in Romford, raised in Leytonstone
Roy Shaw, author, businessman and former criminal, born in Stepney, lived in Bethnal Green and Waltham Abbey
Teddy Sheringham, footballer and manager, from Highams Park
Marina Sirtis, actress, born in Hackney
Thomas Skinner, businessman and television personality, from Romford
Arthur Smith, comedian, from Bermondsey
Stacey Solomon, singer and television personality, born in Dagenham
Terence Stamp, actor, born in Stepney
Nicola Stapleton, actress, born in Elephant and Castle, raised in Walworth
Tommy Steele, 1950s pop and film artist, born in Bermondsey
Mark Strong, actor, born in Clerkenwell
Alan Sugar, business magnate and television personality, from Hackney
Joe Swash, actor and television presenter, from Islington
Reg Varney, actor and comedian, born in Canning Town
Terry Venables, former footballer and manager, from Dagenham
Sid Vicious, punk rock musician, born in Lewisham
Gregg Wallace, television presenter and former greengrocer, born in Peckham
Jessie Wallace, actress, born in Enfield
Shani Wallis, actress, known for her role as Nancy in the 1968 Musical Film "Oliver!", born in Tottenham
Danniella Westbrook, actress, born in Walthamstow
Barbara Windsor, actress, born in Shoreditch
Amy Winehouse, musician, born in Enfield, raised in Southgate
Anna Wing, actress, from Hackney
Ray Winstone, actor, born in Homerton, raised in Plaistow and Enfield
Jake Wood, actor and GEICO gecko voiceover artist, born in Westminster
Adam Woodyatt, actor, known for his portrayal of the character and internet meme Ian Beale, from Walthamstow
Jess Wright, television personality, model and singer, born in Tower Hamlets
Mark Wright, television personality and footballer, born in Buckhurst Hill

Use in films and series

Many of Ken Loach's early films were set in London. Loach has a reputation for using genuine dialect speakers in films:
 3 Clear Sundays Up the Junction Cathy Come Home Poor Cow (the title being a Cockney expression for "poor woman")AlfieThe Mighty Boosh. The Hitcher, a character played by Noel Fielding, is notoriously Cockney.
 Sparrows Can't Sing. The film had to be subtitled when released in the United States owing to difficulties with audience comprehension.
 Bronco Bullfrog. The film's tagline was "Cockney youth - with English subtitles".
 The Long Good Friday. The DVD of this film has an extra feature that explains the rhyming slang used.Pygmalion, a play by George Bernard Shaw.
 My Fair Lady, a musical based on Bernard Shaw's play.
 In A Clockwork Orange, the fictional language used of Nadsat had some influence from Cockney.
 Mary Poppins (and featuring Dick Van Dyke's infamous approximation of a Cockney accent)
 Mary Poppins Returns (with Lin-Manuel Miranda, who plays Jack, stating "If they [the audience] didn't like Dick's accent, they'll be furious with mine")
 Sweeney Todd: The Demon Barber of Fleet Street (2007) — Mrs. Nellie Lovett and Tobias Ragg have Cockney accents.
 Passport to Pimlico. A newspaper headline in the film refers to the Pimlico residents as "crushed Cockneys".
 Cockneys vs Zombies My Little Pony: Equestria Girls – Spring Breakdown. Ragamuffin, portrayed by Jason Michas, has a Cockney accent.
 Pinocchio, The Coachman, voiced by Charles Judels, has a Cockney accent.
 The Gentlemen Football Factory Green Street Elite Legend. The two main characters, Ronnie and Reggie Kray plus a certain number of other characters have a cockney accent.
 Peaky Blinders. The characters Alfie Solomons and Billie Kimber speak with a cockney accent.

See also

 Cockney Wanker
 EastEnders''
 Estuary English
 Languages of the United Kingdom
 List of British regional nicknames
 Madras Bashai and Bambaiya Hindi, similar working class dialects of Tamil and Hindi respectively used in the cities of Chennai and Mumbai, India
 London slang
 Mockney
 Possessive me
 Cockney rhyming slang

References

Bibliography

External links
 
 
 
  — Listen to examples of London and other regional accents and dialects of the UK on the British Library's "Sounds Familiar" website

English language in England
English language in London
British regional nicknames
City colloquials
Culture in London
Working-class culture in England
English words